Crawley Down Gatwick Football Club is a football club based in Crawley Down, West Sussex, England.

History
The club was established in 1993 as a merger of Crawley Down United and two other clubs, and was initially named Crawley Down Village. They took the place of Crawley Down United in the Premier Division of the Mid-Sussex League, and after a third-place finish in their first season, they were champions of the league in 1994–95. The club were promoted to Division Three of the Sussex County League. They were Division Three runners-up in their first season in the division, earning promotion to Division Two. In 1999 the club were renamed Crawley Down. Although they finished third in 1998–99, they were unable to be promoted to Division One due to a lack of floodlights at their ground.

In 2010–11 Crawley Down finished third in Division Two, earning promotion to Division One after floodlights were installed. After finishing eighth in their first season in the division, they were Division One champions in 2010–11 and were promoted to Division One South of the Isthmian League; the season also saw them win the Sussex RUR Cup, beating AFC Uckfield Town 2–0 in the final. In 2012 the club were renamed again, becoming Crawley Down Gatwick. The 2013–14 season saw them finish second-from-bottom of Division One South, resulting in relegation back to the Sussex County League. The following season saw a second successive relegation as they finished second-from-bottom of Division One of the Sussex County League. At the end of the season, the league and divisions were renamed, resulting in the club playing in Division One of the Southern Combination for the 2015–16.

Ground
The club plays at the Haven Sportsfield on Hophurst Lane. The ground has a bar, which provides a small area of cover for spectators. A temporary perimeter fence is removed during the summer. Floodlights and a new stand were installed in 2007.

Honours
Southern Combination
Division One champions 2010–11
Mid-Sussex League
Premier Division champions 1994–95
Sussex RUR Cup
Winners: 2010–11

Records
Best FA Cup performance: First qualifying round, 2009–10, 2011–12, 2020–21
Best FA Trophy performance: First qualifying round, 2012–13, 2013–14
Best FA Vase best performance: Second round, 2007–08, 2014–15
Record attendance: 404 vs East Grinstead Town, 1996

See also
Crawley Down Gatwick F.C. players
Crawley Down Gatwick F.C. managers

References

External links

 
Football clubs in England
Football clubs in West Sussex
Association football clubs established in 1993
1993 establishments in England
Mid Sussex District
Mid-Sussex Football League
Southern Combination Football League
Isthmian League
Works association football teams in England